This is a list of crime films released in the 2000s.
List of crime films of 2000
List of crime films of 2001
List of crime films of 2002
List of crime films of 2003
List of crime films of 2004
List of crime films of 2005
List of crime films of 2006
List of crime films of 2007
List of crime films of 2008
List of crime films of 2009

2000s
Crime